Anticostiodus is an extinct genus of multielement conodonts. Specimens have been described from the Lower Silurian (early Aeronian) of Gun River Formation of Anticosti Island, Quebec. Two species are included under the genus, Anticostiodus fahraeusi and Anticostiodus boltoni. Both species occur near the base of the Distomodus staurognathoides zone and in an open subtidal environment.

References

External links 

 

Prioniodontida genera
Fossils of Canada
Biota of Quebec
Silurian conodonts
Paleontology in Quebec